English Cemetery may refer to:

 English Cemetery, Florence, Italy
 English Cemetery, Naples, Italy
 British Cemetery, Elvas, Portugal
 English Cemetery, Málaga, Spain

See also 
British Cemetery (disambiguation)